Barbodes microps is a species of cyprinid fish endemic to Indonesia.  This species can reach a length of  TL.

References 

Barbodes
Freshwater fish of Indonesia
Fish described in 1868
Taxa named by Albert Günther